is a Japanese football player. She plays for AS Harima Albion. She played for Japan national team.

Club career
Chiba was born in Osaka on June 15, 1993. After graduating from Himeji Hinomoto College, she joined AS Harima Albion based in Himeji in 2014.

National team career
On June 2, 2016, Chiba debuted for Japan national team against United States. She played 5 games for Japan until 2017.

National team statistics

References

External links

Japan Football Association
AS Harima Albion

1993 births
Living people
Association football people from Osaka Prefecture
Japanese women's footballers
Japan women's international footballers
Nadeshiko League players
AS Harima Albion players
Women's association football midfielders
Sportspeople from Osaka